Blanchard Montgomery III (born February 17, 1961 in Los Angeles, California) is a retired American football linebacker who played professionally in the  National Football League.

After playing his college ball at UCLA, Montgomery was drafted in the third round of the 1983 NFL Draft.  Montgomery played just two seasons in the NFL, but was a member of the Super Bowl XIX champion San Francisco 49ers team.

External links
 NFL Stats
 NFL stats at Database football

1961 births
Living people
Players of American football from Los Angeles
American football linebackers
UCLA Bruins football players
San Francisco 49ers players